Overblown: How Politicians and the Terrorism Industry Inflate National Security Threats, and Why We Believe Them is a book by the American political scientist John E. Mueller published in 2006. It argues that the threat presented by terrorism, like many other security threats, has been much inflated.

The book and the argument

Origins
Mueller, an expert on war and terrorism, had been expressing critical views of the terrorism industry for some time before publishing this book. The central arguments of the book were rehearsed for the first time in a 2005 article in one of the leading academic journals devoted to the study of terrorism, Terrorism and Political Violence, "Six Rather Unusual Propositions about Terrorism."

Argument
Mueller's central argument is that an American is more likely to die of drowning in the bath than in a terrorist attack, and that the rational response to terrorism is to keep the threat in realistic context, and otherwise getting on with life. That this does not happen has something to do with the terrorism industry--experts, journalists and politicians—and something to do with the human inability to assess risk and chance accurately.

Mueller goes in his book to extend his central argument to other varieties of national security threat.

Bibliography
John Mueller, Overblown: How Politicians and the Terrorism Industry Inflate National Security Threats, and Why We Believe Them (New York: Free Press, 2006). 
John Mueller, "Six Rather Unusual Propositions about Terrorism," Terrorism and Political Violence 17 (Autumn 2005), pp. 487‑505.

References

Mark Sedgwick, Review of Overblown, in Terrorism and Political Violence 19 (2007), pp. 438–40.

2006 non-fiction books
American political books
War on Terror books